John George Psychiatric Hospital, previously John George Psychiatric Pavilion, also known as John George Psychiatric Emergency Room, John George Hospital or John George, is a psychiatric hospital located in San Leandro, in Alameda County, California. It is operated by the Alameda Health System.

It is located near Fairmont Hospital and the county Juvenile Justice Center. It opened in 1992 and was named after County Supervisor John George to honor his advocacy for mentally ill people. It has an 80-bed capacity. 

In November 2003, a doctor at the facility, Erlinda Ursua, died there and a patient, a 38-year-old female  was charged with murder. The female patient pled not guilty in 2005.  No criminal charges were later filed.

See also

List of hospitals in California

References

Buildings and structures in San Leandro, California
Hospitals in the San Francisco Bay Area
Psychiatric hospitals in California